The 2020 Arkansas Razorbacks football team represented the University of Arkansas in the 2020 NCAA Division I FBS football season. The Razorbacks played their home games at Donald W. Reynolds Razorback Stadium in Fayetteville, Arkansas. The team competed as a member of the Western Division of the Southeastern Conference (SEC) and was led by first-year head coach Sam Pittman.

In a season impacted by the COVID-19 pandemic, the Razorbacks compiled a 3–7 record, all in conference play. This was the first season since War Memorial Stadium in Little Rock opened that the Razorbacks did not play at least one home game in that stadium. Arkansas was scheduled to play the annual Red/White spring game at War Memorial in April at the conclusion of spring practice, but the SEC did not approve those plans.

On October 3, Arkansas defeated No. 16 Mississippi State, 21–14, snapping a 20-game SEC losing streak. It marked their first conference win since October 2017, their first win against a ranked team since November 2016, and their first road win against a ranked SEC team since November 2015.

After the regular season completed, the Razorbacks accepted a bid to the 2020 Texas Bowl. Slated to face TCU, the bowl was canceled when TCU had to withdraw due to COVID-19 issues within their program.

Previous season

The Razorbacks finished the 2019 season 2–10, 0–8 in SEC play, for the second consecutive year, to finish in last place in the Western Division. After the Razorbacks' tenth game of the season, a loss to Western Kentucky that dropped the Hogs to 2–8, second-year head coach Chad Morris was fired. He finished at Arkansas with a record of 4–18. Barry Lunney Jr. finished the season as interim coach and departed the program to serve as the offensive coordinator at UTSA after the season ended.

Season

SEC Media Days
In the preseason media poll, Arkansas was predicted to finish in last place in the West Division.

Preseason All-SEC teams
The Razorbacks had one player selected to the preseason all-SEC teams, released on September 17, 2020.

Offense

2nd team

Rakeem Boyd – RB

Recruits
The Razorbacks signed a total of 19 recruits from high school and junior college.

Arkansas also signed six transfers in the 2020 class.

Personnel

Roster

Coaching staff

Schedule
The Razorbacks' 2020 schedule consists of 5 home games and 5 away games. The Razorbacks will host SEC foes Georgia, Alabama, LSU for the Battle for the Golden Boot game, Tennessee, and Ole Miss, and will travel to face Florida, Mississippi State, Auburn, Texas A&M for the Southwest Classic game, and Missouri for the Battle Line Rivalry game.

Arkansas had games scheduled against Charleston Southern, Louisiana–Monroe, Nevada, and Notre Dame, which were all canceled due to the COVID-19 pandemic.

In August 2020, the conference revealed the 10-game conference schedules that each team would be playing, consisting of the eight conference games already scheduled plus an additional two crossover games (one home and one away). After Arkansas was scheduled to play Georgia and Florida, the top two teams in the East Division in 2019, athletic director Hunter Yurachek stated that Arkansas had "the most challenging schedule in the history of college football." The full 10-game schedule was released by the conference on August 17.

On November 23, 2020, Arkansas' game against Missouri was postponed due to an increase in COVID-19 cases within the Arkansas program. On November 27, 2020, the SEC revised the schedules of multiple teams over the next few weeks, a move that saw the Arkansas–Missouri contest moved to December 5 and the Arkansas–Alabama game moved to a date to be determined and later scheduled for December 12.

The Razorbacks were selected to participate in the 2020 Texas Bowl against TCU but the game was canceled two days beforehand because of COVID-19 concerns in the Horned Frogs' program.

Game summaries

No. 4 Georgia

at No. 16 Mississippi State

at No. 13 Auburn

Ole Miss

at No. 8 Texas A&M

Tennessee

at No. 6 Florida

LSU

at Missouri

No. 1 Alabama

Statistics

Team

Scores by quarter

Rankings

*Poll not released week 1.

Players drafted into the NFL

Notes

References

Arkansas
Arkansas Razorbacks football seasons
Arkansas Razorbacks football